The Sawi or Sawuy are a tribal people of Western New Guinea, Indonesia. They were known to be cannibalistic headhunters as recently as the 1950s. They speak the Sawi language, which belongs to the Trans-New Guinea language family.

Since then, many of the tribe have converted to Christianity and the world's largest circular building made strictly from un-milled poles was constructed in 1972 as a Christian meeting place by the Sawi. Christian missionary Don Richardson who lived among the Sawi wrote a book about the experience called Peace Child.

See also

Indigenous people of New Guinea

References

Further reading
 Peace Child (1974)

External links
 Never the Same  Documentary about visit to the Sawi in 2012

Ethnic groups in Indonesia
Indigenous ethnic groups in Western New Guinea
Cannibalism in Oceania
Headhunting in New Guinea
Tribes of Oceania